The Indian Orthopaedic Association was founded in 1955 and as on 2013 had over 9,000 members.

History  
The first surgeons who focused on orthopedic surgeries in India were Dr. R J Katrak, Dr. N S Narasimha Aiyar and Dr. S R Chandra. After World War II, Dr. Mukhopadhaya and Dr. K S Grewal suggested forming an association during the annual conference of ASI in Vellore in 1952. Many practicing surgeons met in Agra in 1953, most prominently Katrak, Dr. B N Sinha, Grewal, Mukopadhaya and Dr. A K Gupta. They agreed to form an orthopedic section of ASI. However, in 1954, the general body of the ASI at Hyderabad rejected the proposal.

The society was officially formed in Amritsar at an ASI meeting in December 1955. Dr. B N Sinha and Dr. Mukopadhaya were unanimously elected president and secretary.  Dr. A K Talwalkar started the Johnson & Johnson and the Smith & Nephew traveling fellowships on behalf of IOA. The annual Kini Memorial Oration started in 1958. Sir Harry Platt served as the first Orator in 1958. The members of the Association published the first issue of a journal in 1967 with Prakash Chandra as the Editor. A constitution prepared by a select committee was unanimously approved at the General Body meeting in 1967. This was later registered under the Indian Societies Act.

At the 1986 Agra ASI conference, the IOA became independent of ASI. Sixteen regional chapters were formed.

Sub Specialty Societies

State Chapters
{{columns-list|colwidth=22em|
 Andhra Pradesh
 Bihar
 Chhattisgarh
 Delhi
 Gujarat
 Himachal Pradesh
 Karnataka
 Kerala
 Madhya Pradesh
 Maharashtra
 Nerosa
 Odisha
 Punjab
 Rosa
 Tamil Nadu
 Uttar Pradesh
 Uttrakhand
 West Bengal
 Telangana

References

External links
 

Organizations established in 1955
Orthopedic organizations
Medical associations based in India
1955 establishments in India